Rita of Cascia, born Margherita Lotti (1381 – 22 May 1457), was an Italian widow and Augustinian nun venerated as a saint in the Roman Catholic Church.

After Rita's husband died, she joined an Augustinian community of religious sisters, where she was known both for practicing mortification of the flesh and for the efficacy of her prayers. Various miracles are attributed to her intercession, and she is often portrayed with a bleeding wound on her forehead, which is understood to indicate a partial stigmata.

Pope Leo XIII canonized Rita on 24 May 1900. Her feast day is celebrated on 22 May. At her canonization ceremony, she was bestowed the title of Patroness of Impossible Causes, while in many Catholic countries, Rita came to be known as the patroness of abused wives and heartbroken women. Her incorrupt body remains in the Basilica of Santa Rita da Cascia.

Early life 

Margherita Lotti was born in 1381 in the city of Roccaporena, a small suburb of Cascia (near Spoleto, Umbria, Italy) where various sites connected with her are the focus of pilgrimages. Her name, Margherita, means "pearl". She was affectionately called Rita, the short form of her baptismal name. Her parents, Antonio and Amata Ferri Lotti, were known to be noble, charitable persons, who gained the epithet Conciliatori di Cristo (English: Peacemakers of Christ).

According to pious accounts, Rita was originally pursued by a notary named Gubbio but she resisted his offer. She was married at age twelve to a nobleman named Paolo Mancini. Her parents arranged her marriage, a common practice at the time, despite her repeated requests to be allowed to enter a convent of religious sisters.  Her husband, Paolo Mancini, was known to be a rich, quick-tempered, immoral man, who had many enemies in the region of Cascia. The marriage lasted for eighteen years, during which she is remembered for her Christian values as a model wife and mother who made efforts to convert her husband from his abusive behavior.

Rita endured his insults, physical abuse and infidelities for many years. According to popular tales, through humility, kindness and patience, Rita was able to convert her husband into a better person, more specifically renouncing a family feud known at the time as La Vendetta. Rita eventually bore two sons, Giangiacomo (Giovanni) Antonio and Paulo Maria, and brought them up in the Christian faith. As time went by and the family feud between the Chiqui and Mancini families became more intense, Paolo Mancini became congenial, but his allies betrayed him and he was violently stabbed to death by Guido Chiqui, a member of the feuding family.

Rita gave a public pardon at Paolo's funeral to her husband's murderers. Paolo Mancini's brother, Bernardo, was said to have continued the feud and hoped to convince Rita's sons to seek revenge. Bernardo convinced Rita's sons to leave their manor and live at the Mancini villa ancestral home. As her sons grew, their characters began to change as Bernardo became their tutor. Rita's sons wished to avenge their father's murder. Rita, fearing that her sons would lose their souls, tried to dissuade them from retaliating, but to no avail. She asked God to remove her sons from the cycle of vendettas and prevent mortal sin and murder. Her sons died of dysentery a year later, which pious Catholics believe was God's answer to her prayer, taking them by natural death rather than risk them committing a mortal sin punishable by Hell.

After the deaths of her husband and sons, Rita desired to enter the monastery of Saint Mary Magdalene in Cascia, but was turned away. Although the convent acknowledged Rita's good character and piety, the nuns were afraid of being associated with her due to the scandal of her husband's violent death and because she was not a virgin. However, Rita persisted in her cause and was given a condition before the convent could accept her: the task of reconciling her family with her husband's murderers. She implored her three patron saints (John the Baptist, Augustine of Hippo, and Nicholas of Tolentino) to assist her, and she set about the task of establishing peace between the hostile parties of Cascia. Popular religious tales recall that the bubonic plague, which ravaged Italy at the time, infected Bernardo Mancini, causing him to relinquish his desire to feud any longer with the Chiqui family. She was able to resolve the conflicts between the families and, at the age of thirty-six, was allowed to enter the monastery.

Pious Catholic legends later recount that Rita was transported into the monastery of Saint Magdalene via levitation at night into the garden courtyard by her three patron saints. She remained at the monastery, living by the Augustinian Rule, until her death from tuberculosis on 22 May 1457.

Veneration 

The Augustinian Father Agostino Cavallucci from Foligno wrote the first biography of Rita based on oral tradition. The Vita was published in 1610 by Matteo Florimi in Siena. The work was composed long before her beatification, but the title page nevertheless refers to Rita as already ‘blessed’. Another "Acta" or life story of the woman was compiled by the Augustinian priest Jacob Carelicci. Rita was beatified by Pope Urban VIII in 1626. The pope's private secretary, Fausto Poli, had been born some fifteen kilometers (nine miles) from her birthplace and much of the impetus behind her cult is due to his enthusiasm. Rita was also mentioned in a French volume on important Augustinians by Simplicien Saint-Martin. She was canonized on 24 May 1900 by Pope Leo XIII. Her feast day is 22 May. On the 100th anniversary of her canonization in 2000, Pope John Paul II noted her remarkable qualities as a Christian woman: "Rita interpreted well the 'feminine genius' by living it intensely in both physical and spiritual motherhood."

Rita has acquired the reputation, together with St. Jude, as a saint of impossible causes. She is also the patron saint of sterility, abuse victims, loneliness, marriage difficulties, parenthood, widows, the sick, bodily ills, and wounds.

Rita's body, which has remained incorrupt over the centuries, is venerated today in the shrine at Cascia, which bears her name. Many people visit her tomb each year from all over the world. French painter Yves Klein had been dedicated to her as an infant. In 1961, he created a Shrine of St. Rita, which is in Cascia Convent.

Iconography 

Various religious symbols are related to Rita. She is depicted holding a thorn (a symbol of her penance and stigmata), holding a large Crucifix, holding a Palm leaf with three crowns (representing her two sons and husband), flanked by two small children (her sons), holding a Gospel book, holding a skull (a symbol of mortality), and holding a flagellum whip (a symbol of her mortification of the flesh).

The forehead wound 
When Rita was approximately sixty years of age, she was meditating before an image of Christ crucified. Suddenly, a small wound appeared on her forehead, as though a thorn from the crown that encircled Christ's head had loosened itself and penetrated her own flesh. It was considered to be a partial Stigmata, and she bore this external sign of union with Christ until her death in 1457. At the time of her death, the sisters of the convent bathed and dressed her body for burial. They noticed that her forehead wound remained the same, with drops of blood still reflecting light. When her body was later exhumed, it was noted that her forehead wound still remained the same, with the glistening light reflected from the drops of blood. Her body showed no signs of deterioration. Over several years, her body was exhumed two more times. Each time, her body appeared the same. She was declared an incorruptible after the third exhumation. Relics were taken at that time as is the custom in the Catholic Church in preparation for sainthood.

Roses 
It is said that near the end of her life Rita was bedridden at the convent. While visiting her, a cousin asked if she desired anything from her old home. Rita responded by asking for a rose from the garden. It was January, and her cousin did not expect to find one due to the season. However, when her relative went to the house, a single blooming rose was found in the garden, and her cousin brought it back to Rita at the convent. St. Rita is often depicted holding roses or with roses nearby. On her feast day, churches and shrines of St. Rita provide roses to the congregation that are blessed by the priest during Mass.

The Bees 

In the parish church of Laarne, near Ghent, Belgium, there is a statue of Rita in which several bees are featured. This depiction originates from the story of her baptism as an infant. On the day after her baptism, her family noticed a swarm of white bees flying around her as she slept in her crib. However, the bees peacefully entered and exited her mouth without causing her any harm or injury. Instead of being alarmed for her safety, her family was mystified by this sight. According to Butler, this was taken to indicate that the career of the child was to be marked by industry, virtue, and devotion.

Legacy 
In the 20th century, a large sanctuary was built for Rita in Cascia. The sanctuary and the house where she was born are among the most active pilgrimage sites of Umbria.

The National Shrine of Saint Rita of Cascia in Philadelphia, Pennsylvania, was built in 1907 and is a popular pilgrimage and devotional site.

French singer Mireille Mathieu adopted Rita as her patron saint on the advice of her paternal grandmother. In her autobiography, Mathieu describes buying a candle for Rita using her last franc. Though Mathieu claims that her prayers were not always answered, she testifies that they inspired her to become a strong and determined woman.

In 1943, Rita of Cascia, a film based on Rita's life, was made, starring Elena Zareschi. The story of Rita increased in popularity due to a 2004 film titled Santa Rita da Cascia, filmed in Florence, Italy. The latter film altered the facts of Rita's early life.

Rita is often credited as also being the unofficial patron saint of baseball due to a reference made to her in the 2002 film The Rookie.

The 2019 science fiction novella Sisters of the Vast Black features a fictional group of nuns known as the Order of Saint Rita.

St. Rita's Church is located in Nanthirickal, Kollam district, in the state of Kerala, India. It is the only church in Asia to have relics of Saint Rita. It is the only Catholic church in Kerala named after St. Rita.

See also 
 List of saints canonized by Pope Leo XIII
 Saint Rita of Cascia, patron saint archive

References

External links 
 Sanctuary of Saint Rita in Cascia, Italy
 Society of Saint Rita in Roccaporena, Italy
 National Shrine of Saint Rita in Philadelphia
 

1381 births
1457 deaths
Augustinian nuns
Augustinian saints
15th-century Italian Roman Catholic religious sisters and nuns
People from the Province of Perugia
15th-century Christian saints
Incorrupt saints
Stigmatics
Christian female saints of the Middle Ages
Canonizations by Pope Leo XIII
Pope Leo XIII